Battle of the Sacred Tree is a 1994 Kenyan film by Wanjiru Kinyanjui.

Plot
The film gives us insight on how people of a society would still want to remain worshiping idols or lesser gods than being converted in to Christians.

References

Kenyan drama films
1994 films